Thed Björk (born 14 December 1980 in Vretstorp, Örebro) is a Swedish racing driver, and 2017 World Touring Car Champion. Other notable titles include the 2006 Swedish Touring Car Championship and the 2013, 2014 and 2015 Scandinavian Touring Car Championship. He also finished second in 2005 and 2009, and third in the 2008 STCC and the 2012 TTA – Racing Elite League.

Career

Early career

After graduating from Karting in 1997 Björk raced in the Swedish and Nordic Formula 3 series, taking both titles in 1999. For 2000 he went to the United States to race in the Barber Dodge Pro Series. Björk took one pole position, lap record at Mid-Ohio and two fastest race laps. His best race finish was a fourth place and had he had one fifth and three sixth places. Björk finished 10th overall.

2001 saw Björk race in several different series; concentrating on the FIA Sportscar Championship SR2 class for Sportscar Racing Team Sweden, taking the title together with American Larry Oberto. Björk finished third in the Swedish GT series, and was on the podium in 11 out of 12 races, and he also made his debut in STCC, filling in for Kristoffersson Motorsport's Roberto Colciago for one weekend. There he showed pace from the start, finishing second in one of the weekend's two races. He also raced in the 24 Hours of Daytona, taking the class pole position and fastest lap but had to retire after gearbox failure while in the lead.

In 2002 Björk raced in the Formula 3000 series for team Nordic but did not score any points and finished 15th overall and 12th in the LMP900 class in the 2002 24 Hours of Le Mans racing for Courage Compétition.

He returned to Sweden in 2003 for another stint of GTR, this time taking the title in a Chrysler Viper GTS-R, winning all of the races he started in - only a single non-start prevented him from winning every single event. GTR however was disbanded by the end of the year, leaving Björk without a seat for 2004.

When Niklas Lovén and the works STCC BMW team WestCoast Racing parted ways midway through the 2004 season, Björk was called in to replace him. He took two podium finishes and ended up 11th overall. He stayed with the team for 2005, winning two races, was on the podium in six out of eight races and finished second overall.

In 2006 he signed for the Kristoffersson Motorsport Audi team, the same team that he raced for in 2001. The move proved to be a successful one; Björk took the championship lead with a win in the first race and kept it for the rest of the season, taking the title ahead of his former teammate Richard Göransson. During the season he took three race wins and finished on the podium on six occasions.

DTM

When the Futurecom TME Audi DTM driver Nicolas Kiesa injured his leg in a motocross accident with two races remaining Björk was called in as a replacement. In an outdated 2004 car he was third on the first free practice - his first run in the car - but then returned to where the older cars were usually seen, further down the field. He was rumored to drive for Audi for the 2007 season, but missed out on a drive.

Racing record

American Open-Wheel racing results
(key) (Races in bold indicate pole position, races in italics indicate fastest race lap)

Barber Dodge Pro Series

24 Hours of Le Mans results

Complete International Formula 3000 results
(key) (Races in bold indicate pole position) (Races in italics indicate fastest lap)

Complete Deutsche Tourenwagen Masters results
(key)

† Driver did not finish, but completed 90% of race distance.

Complete Swedish Touring Car Championship results
(key) (Races in bold indicate pole position) (Races in italics indicate fastest lap)

† Driver did not finish the race, but was classified as he completed over 90% of the race distance.

Complete Scandinavian Touring Car Championship results
(key) (Races in bold indicate pole position) (Races in italics indicate fastest lap)

† Driver did not finish, but completed 90% of race distance.

Complete TTA - Racing Elite League results
(key) (Races in bold indicate pole position) (Races in italics indicate fastest lap)

Complete World Touring Car Championship results
(key) (Races in bold indicate pole position) (Races in italics indicate fastest lap)

‡ Half points awarded as less than 75% of race distance was completed.

Complete World Touring Car Cup results
(key) (Races in bold indicate pole position) (Races in italics indicate fastest lap)

External links

1980 births
Living people
Swedish racing drivers
Swedish Formula Three Championship drivers
French Formula Three Championship drivers
Swedish Touring Car Championship drivers
International Formula 3000 drivers
24 Hours of Le Mans drivers
European Le Mans Series drivers
Formula Renault V6 Eurocup drivers
Deutsche Tourenwagen Masters drivers
Danish Touring Car Championship drivers
Barber Pro Series drivers
European Touring Car Cup drivers
World Touring Car Championship drivers
World Touring Car Champions
World Touring Car Cup drivers
Sportspeople from Örebro County
Kolles Racing drivers
Audi Sport drivers
Nordic Racing drivers
Prema Powerteam drivers